Muhammad Yawar Ali (born 23 October 1956) is a Pakistani jurist who served as the 46th Chief Justice of Lahore High Court (LHC).

Career
Ali was appointed as additional justice of Lahore High Court on 19 February 2010. He became Chief Justice of the Lahore High Court on 7 February 2018. Upon Ali's retirement on 22 October 2018, he was replaced as Chief Justice of the LHC by Justice Muhammad Anwaarul Haq.

References

	

1956 births
Living people
Chief Justices of the Lahore High Court
Pakistani judges
Place of birth missing (living people)